This list of United Kingdom commemorative stamps deals with commemorative stamps issued by Royal Mail, the postal administration of the United Kingdom.

History
Postage stamps were first used in the United Kingdom of Great Britain and Ireland on 6 May 1840, with the introduction of the world's first adhesive postage stamps, the Penny Black and Two Pence Blue.
Until 1924, all British stamps depicted only the portrait of the reigning monarch, with the exception of the 'High Value' stamps (the so-called "Sea Horses" design) issued in 1913, which were twice the size of normal stamps with added pictorial design.

In 1924, the first commemorative stamp was issued for the British Empire Exhibition. There were then occasional issues over the next thirty years, when the frequency of new issues became more regular. From the mid-1960s, in most years, six to nine sets of commemorative stamps have been issued every year. The General Post Office introduced official First Day Covers and Presentation Packs in the mid-1960s and PHQ Cards, postcard sized reproductions of commemorative stamps, have also been issued to accompany every new set of stamps since the mid-1970s.

Other decades
From 1965 onwards, in most years, there were between six and ten sets issued every year. The listings for the years after 1969 are set out in decades.

 United Kingdom commemorative stamps 1970–1979
 United Kingdom commemorative stamps 1980–1989
 United Kingdom commemorative stamps 1990–1999
 United Kingdom commemorative stamps 2000–2009
 United Kingdom commemorative stamps 2010–2019
 United Kingdom commemorative stamps 2020–2029

See also

 Stamp collecting
 List of people on stamps
 Philately
 PHQ card

References and sources
Notes

Sources
Stanley Gibbons Great Britain Concise Stamp Catalogue
Gibbons Stamp Monthly
Royal Mail Stamp Guide
Royal Mail British Philatelic Bulletin

External links
 Pierron's Online Catalogue
 Royal Mail
 Stamp Artwork Project – stamps from the era of George V, Edward VIII, George VI and Elizabeth II on The British Postal Museum & Archive website
 PSG Postage Stamps Galore

Postage stamps of the United Kingdom
Commemorative stamps
Lists of postage stamps
Commemorative stamps